Marina Aleksandrovna Avstriyskaya (born 21 June 1967) is a Russian former pair skater who competed for the Soviet Union. With Yuri Kvashnin, she won gold at the 1982 and 1983 World Junior Championships and competed at the 1984 Winter Olympics, placing ninth.

She is the mother of Russian figure skater Alexandra Avstriyskaya, born on 30 October 2000.

Results
Pairs with Kvashnin:

References

Navigation

Russian female pair skaters
Soviet female pair skaters
Olympic figure skaters of the Soviet Union
Figure skaters at the 1984 Winter Olympics
Living people
1967 births
Figure skaters from Moscow
World Junior Figure Skating Championships medalists
Russian State University of Physical Education, Sport, Youth and Tourism alumni